This is a list of butterflies of Rwanda. About 176 species are known from Rwanda, three of which are endemic.

Papilionidae

Papilioninae

Papilionini
Papilio charopus montuosus Joicey & Talbot, 1927
Papilio chrapkowskoides Storace, 1952
Papilio rex mimeticus Rothschild, 1897
Papilio echerioides joiceyi Gabriel, 1945
Papilio jacksoni ruandana Le Cerf, 1924
Papilio leucotaenia Rothschild, 1908
Papilio mackinnoni Sharpe, 1891

Leptocercini
Graphium antheus (Cramer, 1779)
Graphium gudenusi (Rebel, 1911)
Graphium angolanus baronis (Ungemach, 1932)
Graphium ridleyanus (White, 1843)
Graphium leonidas (Fabricius, 1793)
Graphium almansor uganda (Lathy, 1906)

Pieridae

Coliadinae
Eurema mandarinula (Holland, 1892)
Eurema regularis (Butler, 1876)
Catopsilia florella (Fabricius, 1775)
Colias electo pseudohecate Berger, 1940

Pierinae
Colotis aurora evarne (Klug, 1829)
Colotis auxo (Lucas, 1852)
Colotis elgonensis basilewskyi Berger, 1956
Colotis vesta kagera Congdon, Kielland & Collins, 1998
Pinacopterix eriphia wittei Berger, 1940
Leptosia nupta pseudonupta Bernardi, 1959

Pierini
Pontia helice johnstonii (Crowley, 1887)
Mylothris alberici Dufrane, 1940
Mylothris bernice berenicides Holland, 1896
Mylothris croceus Butler, 1896
Mylothris jacksoni Sharpe, 1891
Mylothris kiwuensis kiwuensis Grünberg, 1910
Mylothris kiwuensis rhodopoides Talbot, 1944
Mylothris polychroma Berger, 1981
Mylothris rhodope (Fabricius, 1775)
Mylothris ruandana Strand, 1909
Mylothris rubricosta (Mabille, 1890)
Mylothris sagala mayenceae Berger, 1987
Belenois calypso crawshayi Butler, 1894
Belenois raffrayi extendens (Joicey & Talbot, 1927)
Belenois victoria schoutedeni Berger, 1953

Lycaenidae

Miletinae

Liphyrini
Aslauga purpurascens Holland, 1890

Miletini
Lachnocnema laches (Fabricius, 1793)
Lachnocnema durbani Trimen & Bowker, 1887
Lachnocnema divergens Gaede, 1915

Poritiinae

Liptenini
Ornipholidotos peucetia (Hewitson, 1866)

Theclinae
Oxylides albata (Aurivillius, 1895)
Hypolycaena jacksoni Bethune-Baker, 1906
Pilodeudorix mera kinumbensis (Dufrane, 1945)
Pilodeudorix zelomina (Rebel, 1914)

Polyommatinae

Lycaenesthini
Anthene afra (Bethune-Baker, 1910)
Anthene contrastata mashuna (Stevenson, 1937)
Anthene hobleyi kigezi Stempffer, 1961
Anthene schoutedeni (Hulstaert, 1924)

Polyommatini
Uranothauma lunifer (Rebel, 1914)
Cacyreus tespis (Herbst, 1804)
Harpendyreus argenteostriata Stempffer, 1961
Harpendyreus kisaba (Joicey & Talbot, 1921)
Harpendyreus major (Joicey & Talbot, 1924)
Harpendyreus marungensis wollastoni (Bethune-Baker, 1926)
Harpendyreus reginaldi Heron, 1909
Leptotes marginalis (Stempffer, 1944)
Euchrysops crawshayi fontainei Stempffer, 1967
Euchrysops mauensis Bethune-Baker, 1923
Euchrysops subpallida Bethune-Baker, 1923
Thermoniphas distincta (Talbot, 1935)
Thermoniphas plurilimbata rutshurensis (Joicey & Talbot, 1921)
Lepidochrysops loveni kivuensis (Joicey & Talbot, 1921)

Riodinidae

Nemeobiinae
Abisara rutherfordii cyclops Riley, 1932
Abisara neavei Riley, 1932

Nymphalidae

Danainae

Danaini
Tirumala formosa mercedonia (Karsch, 1894)
Amauris albimaculata magnimacula Rebel, 1914
Amauris crawshayi oscarus Thurau, 1904
Amauris echeria terrena Talbot, 1940
Amauris ellioti Butler, 1895

Satyrinae

Melanitini
Gnophodes grogani Sharpe, 1901
Aphysoneura scapulifascia Joicey & Talbot, 1922

Satyrini
Bicyclus aurivillii (Butler, 1896)
Bicyclus dentata (Sharpe, 1898)
Bicyclus jefferyi Fox, 1963
Bicyclus matuta (Karsch, 1894)
Bicyclus persimilis (Joicey & Talbot, 1921)
Bicyclus saussurei angustus Condamin, 1970
Heteropsis perspicua (Trimen, 1873)
Heteropsis ubenica ugandica (Kielland, 1994)
Ypthima albida Butler, 1888
Ypthima granulosa Butler, 1883
Ypthima recta Overlaet, 1955
Neocoenyra duplex Butler, 1886

Charaxinae

Charaxini
Charaxes fulvescens monitor Rothschild, 1900
Charaxes acuminatus kigezia van Someren, 1963
Charaxes alticola Grünberg, 1911
Charaxes lucretius maximus van Someren, 1971
Charaxes hansali baringana Rothschild, 1905
Charaxes ansorgei ruandana Talbot, 1932
Charaxes pollux (Cramer, 1775)
Charaxes druceanus obscura Rebel, 1914
Charaxes druceanus proximans Joicey & Talbot, 1922
Charaxes eudoxus lequeuxi Plantrou, 1982
Charaxes tiridates tiridatinus Röber, 1936
Charaxes bohemani Felder & Felder, 1859
Charaxes xiphares burgessi van Son, 1953
Charaxes imperialis werneri Turlin, 1989
Charaxes fournierae vandenberghei Collins, 1982
Charaxes etesipe (Godart, 1824)
Charaxes jahlusa rwandensis Plantrou, 1976
Charaxes eupale latimargo Joicey & Talbot, 1921
Charaxes montis Jackson, 1956
Charaxes opinatus Heron, 1909
Charaxes turlini  & Plantrou, 1978
Charaxes mafuga van Someren, 1969
Charaxes guderiana (Dewitz, 1879)
Charaxes pleione delvauxi Turlin, 1987
Charaxes zoolina mafugensis Jackson, 1956
Charaxes schiltzei Bouyer, 1991

Euxanthini
Charaxes crossleyi ansorgei (Rothschild, 1903)

Nymphalinae
Kallimoides rumia rattrayi (Sharpe, 1904)

Nymphalini
Antanartia schaeneia dubia Howarth, 1966
Vanessa dimorphica (Howarth, 1966)
Vanessa abyssinica vansomereni (Howarth, 1966)
Junonia sophia infracta Butler, 1888
Junonia westermanni suffusa (Rothschild & Jordan, 1903)
Salamis cacta (Fabricius, 1793)
Protogoniomorpha parhassus (Drury, 1782)
Precis actia Distant, 1880
Precis ceryne (Boisduval, 1847)
Precis milonia wintgensi Strand, 1909
Precis pelarga (Fabricius, 1775)
Precis sinuata hecqui Berger, 1981
Precis tugela pyriformis (Butler, 1896)
Hypolimnas misippus (Linnaeus, 1764)

Biblidinae

Biblidini
Ariadne pagenstecheri (Suffert, 1904)

Limenitinae

Limenitidini
Cymothoe collarti werneri Beaurain, 1984
Kumothales inexpectata Overlaet, 1940
Pseudacraea deludens rwandaensis Hecq, 1991

Neptidini
Neptis agouale parallela Collins & Larsen, 1996
Neptis jordani Neave, 1910
Neptis marci Collins & Larsen, 1998 (endemic)
Neptis strigata kakamega Collins & Larsen, 1996

Adoliadini
Catuna angustatum (Felder & Felder, 1867)
Euriphene excelsior (Rebel, 1911)
Euriphene saphirina (Karsch, 1894)
Bebearia sophus monforti Hecq, 1990
Bebearia dowsetti Hecq, 1990 (endemic)
Euphaedra zaddachii crawshayi Butler, 1895
Euphaedra barnsi Joicey & Talbot, 1922
Euphaedra margueriteae Hecq, 1978
Euphaedra harpalyce dowsetti Hecq, 1990

Heliconiinae

Acraeini
Acraea eltringhami Joicey & Talbot, 1921
Acraea endoscota Le Doux, 1928
Acraea hamata Joicey & Talbot, 1922
Acraea turlini Pierre, 1979 (endemic)
Acraea asboloplintha Karsch, 1894
Acraea persanguinea (Rebel, 1914)
Acraea acerata Hewitson, 1874
Acraea alciope Hewitson, 1852
Acraea amicitiae Heron, 1909
Acraea bonasia (Fabricius, 1775)
Acraea serena (Fabricius, 1775)
Acraea goetzei Thurau, 1903
Acraea toruna Grose-Smith, 1900
Acraea lycoa Godart, 1819
Acraea rangatana bettiana Joicey & Talbot, 1921
Acraea uvui Grose-Smith, 1890
Acraea ventura ochrascens Sharpe, 1902
Acraea cinerea Neave, 1904
Acraea oreas Sharpe, 1891
Acraea orinata Oberthür, 1893

Argynnini
Issoria baumanni excelsior (Butler, 1896)

Vagrantini
Phalanta phalantha aethiopica (Rothschild & Jordan, 1903)

Hesperiidae

Coeliadinae
Coeliades forestan (Stoll, [1782])
Coeliades pisistratus (Fabricius, 1793)

Pyrginae

Tagiadini
Eagris subalbida aurivillii (Neustetter, 1927)

Hesperiinae

Aeromachini
Acleros mackenii olaus (Plötz, 1884)
Chondrolepis niveicornis (Plötz, 1883)
Fresna netopha (Hewitson, 1878)
Pardaleodes fan (Holland, 1894)
Platylesches robustus Neave, 1910

Baorini
Zenonia crasta Evans, 1937

Heteropterinae
Metisella abdeli (Krüger, 1928)
Metisella alticola (Aurivillius, 1925)

See also
List of birds of Rwanda
List of mammals of Rwanda
List of moths of Rwanda

References

Seitz, A. Die Gross-Schmetterlinge der Erde 13: Die Afrikanischen Tagfalter. Plates
Seitz, A. Die Gross-Schmetterlinge der Erde 13: Die Afrikanischen Tagfalter. Text 

Butterflies
Rwanda
Rwanda
 but